Meisam may refer to:

Meisam Aghababaei, Iranian footballer
Meisam Bagheri (born 1991), Iranian taekwondo athlete
Meisam Mirzaei (born 1992), Iranian basketball player
Meisam Mostafa-Jokar (born 1985), Iranian male freestyle wrestler
Meisam Nassiri (born 1989), Iranian freestyle wrestler
Meisam Rezapour (born 1981), Iranian football player